This is a list of metropolitan areas of South Carolina, a state in the Southeastern United States. It is bordered to the north by North Carolina; to the south and west by Georgia, located across the Savannah River; and to the east by the Atlantic Ocean.

See also
Table of United States Metropolitan Statistical Areas
Table of United States Combined Statistical Areas

References

Metropolitan areas of South Carolina
South Carolina